Kingdom Hospital (sometimes known as Stephen King's Kingdom Hospital) is a thirteen-episode television series based on Lars von Trier's The Kingdom (Danish title: Riget), developed by horror writer Stephen King in 2004 for American television. While initially conceived as a miniseries, it was later changed into a regular television series (albeit one that lasted one season). It was first aired on ABC on March 3 and concluded on July 15, 2004 after being put on hold during NBA playoffs.

Kingdom Hospital has been compared to the paranormal hospital drama series All Souls, another production which had been inspired by Von Trier's The Kingdom.

Plot
The story tells of the fictional Kingdom Hospital located in Lewiston, Maine, built on the site of a mill that manufactured military uniforms during the American Civil War. Previously, a hospital known as the "Old Kingdom" had been built on the site, but it burned down. The current hospital is known as the "New Kingdom". The hospital's "turbulent" nature seems to reflect its ominous logo, a crimson stylized dagger, predicting what will come.

A psychic named Mrs. Druse has checked into the hospital numerous times and is taken by the staff to be a hypochondriac. She asks for the assistance of the cynical yet compassionate Dr. Hook to uncover the truth about the hospital and the mysterious spirits who haunt it – including a sinister teenage boy, a young girl who had died in the fire that burned the original hospital down, and a strange animal that follows and protects the young girl, who calls it Antubis (it is similar to a giant anteater, but whose long snout opens up to a set of jagged teeth).

Elsewhere, Peter Rickman, a painter who is admitted to the hospital following a road accident (with severe injuries to his skull and spine) begins to discover the ghastly goings-on while he lies comatose in room 426.

Other subplots included the initiation of arrogant chief of surgery Dr. Stegman into the secret society known as the 'Keepers', and the challenged-at-every-turn flirtation between young Dr. Elmer Traff and sleep doctor Dr. Lona Massingale.

Cast

The hospital staff
 Andrew McCarthy as Dr. Hook, the handsome surgeon who has made it his life's work to destroy incompetence among doctors.
 Bruce Davison as Dr. Stegman, the arrogant, egotistical neurosurgeon who is on the verge of being initiated into the secret society of Kingdom Hospital, despite his numerous malpractice suits. He is given to repetitive bragging of his "great career" in Boston, Massachusetts.
 Meagen Fay as Dr. Brenda Abelson, Steg's only true friend in the hospital, an ambitious woman who would stop at nothing for what she wants.
 Ed Begley Jr. as Dr. Jesse James, Kingdom Hospital's Chief of Staff and member of the 'Keepers' – the Secret Society, who spends his time initiating "Operation: Morning Air".
 Jamie Harrold as Dr. Elmer Traff, a young surgeon whose father is an important man in the hospital. He is smitten with Dr. Massingale and pursues her romantically.
 Sherry Miller as Dr. Lona Massingale, the enigmatic sleep doctor, and love interest of Elmer, despite her determination not to get involved with "a child".
 Allison Hossack as Dr. Christine Draper, Kingdom Hospital's friendliest doctor, who has a romantic interest in Dr. Hook.
 William Wise as Dr. Louis Traff, the leader of the Keepers, and also an important doctor at Kingdom Hospital; its longest serving member.
 Lena Georgas as Nurse Carrie von Trier, Peter's nurse, who is afraid of blood.
 Brandon Bauer as Abel Lyon, an orderly with Down syndrome, who sneaks around Kingdom Hospital with his friend Christa, being a trickster. Both he and Christa have an uncanny knack of knowing all the hospital's goings-on, including those of the otherworld.
 Jennifer Cunningham as Christa Mendelson, Abel's partner-in-crime, who also has Down syndrome. Abel and Christa show a strange affinity for the hospital's mechanical workings.
 Julian Richings as Otto, the all-purpose man of Kingdom, who regularly watches the security feeds. Otto is accompanied by Blondi, an intelligent German Shepherd Dog. Blondi has on several occasions shown self-consciousness and actual thought capabilities; as an in-joke, he thinks in a German accent. Blondi's name is a reference to Adolf Hitler's favorite German Shepherd Dog, also named Blondi.
 Del Pentecost as Bobby Druse, Mrs. Druse's son, and an orderly at the hospital.

Patients, past and present
 Diane Ladd as Sally Druse, a professed psychic, who regularly checks into Kingdom Hospital for all sorts of complaints, and who is determined to discover the truth lurking in the hospital's depths.
 Jack Coleman as Peter Rickman, a comatose painter who is discovering the past and future of Kingdom Hospital. He has latent psychic abilities that are triggered after his near death experience and proceed to develop through the season allowing him to perceive ghosts and travel between the human and spirit world.
 Suki Kaiser as Natalie Rickman, Peter's wife, determined not to believe in the phenomena plaguing Kingdom Hospital.
 Jodelle Micah Ferland as Mary Jensen, the ghost of a girl murdered to cover up the arson of the mill in the 1860s; she is a symbol of death in Kingdom Hospital.
 Kett Turton as Paul Morlock, Dr. Gottreich's young assistant, who haunts the hospital as a figure of evil.

Recurring cast
 Ron Selmour as the firecracker man
 Zak Santiago as Dr. Sonny Gupta
 Beverley Elliott as Nurse Brick Bannerman
 Christopher Heyerdahl as Reverend Jimmy Criss, a "miracle worker"
 Antony Holland as Lenny Stillmach, an elderly patient
 Michael Lerner as Sheldon Fleischer, a scheming attorney
 Bill Meilen as Dr. Gottreich, a ghostly torture expert
 Claudette Mink as Celeste Daldry, a reporter for Channel 9
 Ty Olsson as Danny, an EMT
 Gerard Plunkett as Dr. Richard Shwartzon, a seismologist
 Paul Perri as Frank Schweigen, a vagrant who falls victim to Steg's incompetence and Elmer's pranks
 Benjamin Ratner as Ollie, Danny's fellow EMT
 Ryan Robbins as Dave Hoonan, Peter's hit and run driver
 Alan Scarfe as Dr. Henry Havens
 Jim Shield as Rolf Pedersen, a convict in the hospital
 Emily Tennant as Mona Klingerman, a young girl with irreparable brain damage due to Steg's incompetence
 Janet Wright as Nurse Liz Hinton
 Kett Turton as Antubis, the giant anteater-like companion of the ghost of Mary Jensen. Near the end of the season, he reveals his true name is Anubis, but accepts Mary's mispronunciation of his name without any problems.

Guest stars
Charles Martin Smith, Wayne Newton, Lorena Gale (Battlestar Galactica), Bruce Harwood (The Lone Gunmen), Evangeline Lilly (Lost), Tygh Runyan (The L Word), Peter Wingfield (Highlander: The Series), Callum Keith Rennie (Due South), Christine Willes (Dead Like Me), William B. Davis (The X-Files), and Stephen King ("writer") all have guest appearances.

Production
King and producer Mark Carliner discovered the source material, the five-hour Danish television movie called Riget (Kingdom in English), while searching through a video store during the making of the 1997 TV miniseries adaptation of King's novel The Shining. They tried to buy the rights to the Danish original, only to learn that Columbia Pictures had acquired them and intended to make a theatrical movie. After five years, Columbia concluded the work could not be adapted in two-hour form and sold the rights in exchange for the rights to King's novella from the 1990 book Four Past Midnight called Secret Window, Secret Garden.

This was the first time he had adapted someone else's work rather than his own from scratch. King kept most of the characters and dark humor in place, but added a new central character named Peter Rickman who was based on his own personal experience after being hit by a minivan. King described the finished product as "the thing I like best out of all the things I've done." The series is known for its tangential plots and characters who recur throughout, as King called it a "novelization for television". King committed to write the story line for the following year, should ABC decide to continue the series.

While written as a miniseries, many fans wanted it to be renewed for a second season, and Stephen King had a storyboard written out for one. After incredibly successful ratings for the first episode, the highest rating drama debut of the year on ABC, ratings plummeted thereafter. Despite being cancelled, the series did receive Emmy Award nominations for Special Visual Effects for a Series and Main Title Design.

Episodes

Reception
The show received mixed reviews from critics. The New York Times review argued that the "plot unfolds disjointedly and without enough suspense." CNN felt the premiere was promising and the "jittery pacing and oddball sensibility" were reminiscent of Twin Peaks. The USA Today review stated that the show "does have a few frightening moments, but they don't compensate for the lackluster performances, the absence of character development, humor or pacing, or the wild fluctuations in tone."

The review aggregation website Rotten Tomatoes gave the series a 46% approval rating based on 26 reviews, with an average rating of 5.90/10. The site's critical consensus reads: "Stephen King may bring autobiographical flourishes to this remake of a Danish series, but the self-indulgent Kingdom Hospital lacks the horror maestro's penchant for good scares."

Music

Distribution

Broadcasters
 Australia: Seven Network / Prime Television / Sci Fi Channel (Australia)
 Argentina: SyFy Channel / Space
 Belgium: VT4
 Bolivia: Red ATB/Red PAT (2015)
 Brazil: AXN
 Canada: ABC
 Chile: RED TV
 Denmark: TV3
 Finland: Nelonen
 France: M6
 Germany: Kabel 1
 Greece: Mega Channel
 Hong Kong: TVB Pearl
 Hungary: AXN Sci Fi / RTL Klub
 Honduras: SyFy Channel/AXN
 Italy: Italia 1
 Poland: TVP2 / AXN

Home video
The entire series was released on DVD. The DVD includes four short featurettes that cover the making of the miniseries:
Patients and Doctors: The Cast of Kingdom Hospital is a segment running approximately 14 minutes that takes a look at the 'whys' and 'wherefores' of the casting decisions.
Inside The Walls: The Making of Kingdom Hospital is a segment running a quarter of an hour that gives us a look at the thought process behind getting the actual miniseries made from its origins as Von Trier's original Danish production through King's 're-imagining' of that work. 
Designing Kingdom Hospital: A Tour is a seven-minute piece on the set design. 
The Magic of Antubis is an eight-minute look at the creation of the anteater with thoughts from the director and the chief effects supervisor.

In addition to the four featurettes, there is also a commentary track on the first episode with King, director Craig Baxley, producer Mark Carliner and visual effects supervisor James Tichenor.

References

External links

 
 Kingdom Hospital series page at BBC.co.uk
 
 

2000s American horror television series
2004 American television series debuts
2004 American television series endings
2004 Canadian television series debuts
2004 Canadian television series endings
American Broadcasting Company original programming
Fictional hospitals
Television shows written by Stephen King
Television series by Sony Pictures Television
Television series by ABC Studios
Television shows set in Maine
Television shows filmed in Vancouver
English-language television shows
Horror fiction television series
Lars von Trier